Sharne is both a given name and a surname. Notable people with the name include:

Sharne Mayers (born 1992), Zimbabwean cricketer
Sharne Wehmeyer (born 1980), South African field hockey player 
Peter Sharne (born 1956), Australian former footballer